Naigani (pronounced ) is an island in Fiji's Tailevu Province, eight kilometers north-west of Ovalau.  It is also about 10 kilometers from Tailevu Point on the main island of Viti Levu.

Islands of Fiji
Lomaiviti Province